The American-Canadian ensemble Duo46 was established in 1994 at the University of Arizona in Tucson, Arizona by guitarist Dr. Matthew Gould and violinist Beth Ilana Schneider-Gould.

Their name comes from a violin having four strings, and a guitar having six strings. It may also have to do with the human body having 46 chromosomes.

Since their founding, they have become leading advocates of new chamber music with guitar. They have commissioned and premiered over 100 works (duets/trios/double concertos) and toured on four continents. Besides concerts as a violin and guitar duo or violin, guitar and third instrument or electronics trio, they conduct masterclasses, reading sessions for student composers, coach chamber ensembles, serve as adjudicators and clinicians and give presentations on a variety of subjects. Duo46 resides in Sudbury, Ontario, Canada. There Matt serves as the director of guitar studies at Cambrian College and is a member of the Sudbury Guitar Trio and artistic director the Sudbury Guitar Society. Beth is concertmaster of the Sudbury Symphony Orchestra and teaches at the Sudbury Symphony Conservatory. Both Matt and Beth are former faculty of Eastern Mediterranean University in the Turkish Republic of Northern Cyprus, Paradise Valley Community College and Matt  worked at Arizona State University.

Recordings 
Music from the Ethereal Side of Paradise: Music of John Carollo. Navona Records, NV6148, 2018. (Duo46 performs "Romantica Pasione Suite") Reviews: Art Music Lounge 
Tightly Wound: Music for Strings, Dorothy Hindman. Innova Recordings, #965, 2017. (Duo46 performs "three small gestures")
High Wire Acts: Chamber Music by Laura Schwendinger. Centaur Records, CRC 3098, 2013. (Collaborative CD including Duo46) Reviews: Fanfare Magazine Issue 37:1 with feature articles by Robert Schulslaper,Barnaby Rayfield, Art Lange, and Colin Clarke (September/October 2013) 
Winter & Construction; Music by Scott Brickman. Rovello Records, 2012 
Vientos: The Music of Hayg Boyadjian. Albany Records, TROY 1219, 2010 (Duo46 and Avi Avital, Mandolin)
The Guitar Music of Karl Korte. Centaur Records, CRC 3059, 2010. (Duo46 and Erich Oskar Huetter, Cello)
Pseudosynthesis: The Music of Brian Hulse. Albany Records, TROY1094, 2009. Duo46 with Piano. Reviews: Fanfare (July 2009)
Artists Around The World Perform Stephen Funk Pearson. KYRA Music, 2009. “Seapeace” for B.A.M. (Duo46 and Avi Avital, Mandolin).
Fleeting Visions, Collaboration II. Beauport Classical, BC1804, 2008. Compilation CD including Duo46 performing music by John Carollo.
Fables, Forms and Fears: Music of Paul Richards. Meyer-Media, MM 07008, 2007. Duo46 with Piano. Reviews: Soundboard (Summer, 2008), Classical Guitar (April 2008), Guitar Review (Spring 2008), American Record Guide (April 2008).
Aires de Sefarad by Jorge Liderman. Albany Records, TROY-829, 2006. 46 Spanish Songs for Violin and Guitar: a commissioned work from UC Berkeley composer Jorge Liderman, partially funded by the Guggenheim Foundation. Reviews: Gramophone (June 2006), American Record Guide (June 2006), Classical Guitar (Sept 2006), Guitar Review (Spring 2008).
Communing with Music. Summit Records SMT-6921, 2005. Audio Companion CD. The Art of Conscious Listening by Michael Cantello.
Untaming the Fury. Summit Records SMT-346, 2003. Cmmissioned American Works for Violin and Guitar. Reviews: Gramophone (April 2003), American Record Guide (June 2003), Strad (June 2003), Classical Guitar (January 2004).
FM1: Homage to the 50s. Guitar Plus Records GPR-110198, 1998. Original Concert Music, 1950–1959. Reviews: Classical Guitar (April 2001), American Record Guide (Sept/Oct. 1999), Soundboard (Fall/Winter 1999).

Commissions 
DUO46 (VIOLIN AND GUITAR)
Daniel Adams 		Quandary (2000) 			U.S.
Giovanni Albini 	Death in Vegas (2006) 			ITALY
Daniel Asia 	New Set (2004) 				U.S.
John Armstrong          Five Elements (2020)                    CANADA
Kemal Belevi 		Turkish Suite (2001) 			CYPRUS
Allen Brings 	        Sonata Breve (2005) 			U.S.
Elisabetta Brusa   	Miniature, Op.5a (2006) 		ITALY
John Carollo 		Romanza Pasione Suite (2004) 		U.S.
Cosimo Colazzo 		il moto andante, lento (2006) 		ITALY
Kieth Dippre 		Year of the Rat (2008) 			U.S.
William Fetterman 	Set (2003) 				U.S.
Neil Flory 		Venn Music (1998) 			U.S.
Neil Flory 		Two Nocturnes (1998) 			U.S.
Jack Fortner 		Equal Voices (2008) 			U.S.
Kenneth D. Froelich 	Triskaidekaphilia (2006) 		U.S.
Stacy Garrop 		Untaming the Fury (1999) 		U.S.
Geoffrey Gordon 	Fancyworks (2005) 			U.S.
Stephen Goss 	American Pastoral (2009) 		UK
Giovanni Grosskoff 	it happened in winter (2002) 		ITALY
David Hahn 		W is for Weasel (2003) 			U.S.
Jeff Harrington 	L'Ecume des Temps (2002) 		U.S.
Dorothy Hindman 	Three Small Gestures (2006) 		U.S.
Brian Hulse 		Seastone (2003) 			U.S.
Pierre Jalbert 		Sonatine (1999) 			U.S.
Michael Karmon 		Sessions (2007) 			U.S.
Jukka Kervinen 		next two (2002) 			FINLAND
Jurg Kindle 		Quintessence (2000) 			SWISS
Karl Korte 		Makams (2003) 				U.S.
Anthony Joseph Lanman 	Sonata 46 (1998) 			U.S.
Robert Lemay		Gris sur gris(2012)                     CANADA
Paul Levi 		Kaleidoscope (2006) 			U.S.
Jorge Liderman 	Aires de Sefarad (2004) 		U.S.
Jorge Liderman 	Aires de Sefarad II (2007) 		U.S. 
David Lidov 	Generic Variations (2004) 		CANADA
David Lipten 		Time Served (2005) 			U.S.
Kristy McGarity 	How the Hell are You Feeling? (1998) 	U.S.
Mutsuhito Ogino 	Suite 46 (2005) 			JAPAN
Terry Winter Owens 	Elegy (1998) 				U.S.
Sergio Parotti 		Sonata, Op. 290 (2003) 			ARGENTINA
Alla Penkina 		Recitative, Aria, Dance (2002) 		RUSSIA
Joshua Penman 		was the sky as liquid (1998) 		U.S.
Richard del Pizzo 	Dopo la tempesta (2002) 		U.S.
Friedrich Puetz 	Hausconzert (2002) 			GERMANY
Michael Quell 		Enigma (2005) 				GERMANY
Paul Richards 		Asphalt Gypsy (1999) 			U.S.
Paul Richards 		Prayer of Atonement (2002) 		U.S.
Paul Richards 		Collage (2002) 				U.S.
Jody Rockmaker 		Frantic Antics (2002) 			U.S.
Justin Rubin 		Canzone (2005) 				U.S.
Russell Sarre 		Two Pieces (1999) 			U.S.
Richard Schaefer 	Structures (2000) 			U.S.
Laura Schwendinger 	2 little whos (2004) 			U.S.
Jiradej Sethabundhu 	Smoky Speculations (1998) 		THAILAND

DUO46 AND COMPUTER
Scott Brickman 		When I'm 46 (2006) 			U.S.
Fabrizio Ferrari 	Synchrony (1999) 			ITALY
Steve Kornicki 		Tempo Distortion #2 (2006) 		U.S.
Karl Korte 		Virtual Voices (2007) 			U.S.
Charles Norman Mason 	Scrapings (2007) 			U.S.
John Oliver 		On Freedom (2008) 			CANADA
Allan Segall 		Playing With Your Past (2005) 		U.S.

DUO46 AND CELLO
Karl Korte 		Evocations (2004) 			U.S.

DUO46 AND MANDOLIN
Giovanni Albini 	Nuovo Concerto Italiano (2008) 		ITALY
Hayg Boyadjin 		Vientos (2009) 				ARMENIA
Stephen Funk Pearson 	Seapeace (2009) 		        U.S.
Justin Rubin 		Durkh und Durkh (2007) 			U.S.
Allan Segall 		Playing With Yesterday's Hit Parade (2009)U.S./HOLLAND

DUO46 AND PIANO
Chris Williams		A Pattern of Music (2013)			AUSTRALIA
Scott Brickman 		Snowball (2003) 				U.S.
John Carollo 		Trio No. 2 (2003) 				U.S.
Carson Cooman 		August Latitudes (2002) 			U.S.
Neil Flory 		Venn Music II (2007) 				U.S.
Jeffrey Hoover 		Ysaye's Dream (2003) 			        U.S.
Ed Mascari 		Three for Three (2002) 			        U.S.
Paul Richards 		Cypriot Structures (2003) 			U.S.
Paul Richards 		Falling on Lobsters in the Dark (2003) 	        U.S.
Michael Quell		Blurring Cloud (2010) 			        GERMANY
Justin Rubin 		Sarabande (2002) 				U.S.
Richard Schaefer 	Structures #412 (2003) 				U.S.

DUO46 AND VIOLA
Kemal Belevi 		Turkish Trio (2001) 		                CYPRUS
Mustafa Cakal 		Sunrise in the Meadow (2001) 		        TURKEY
Rafael Hernandez 	Unlucky Thirteenths (2001) 			U.S.
Martin Kennedy 		Distraction (2002) 				U.S.
Georgio Papageorgio 	Humoresque alla Polacca (2002) 		        CYPRUS
Joseph Pehrson 		Three Musicians (2002) 			        U.S.

DUO46 AND CLARINET
Daniel Kessner 		Trio (2010) 					U.S.

Festivals 
Duo46 has made appearances at several music festivals

2020 Kiwanis Music festival Toronto (adjuducation guitar)
2019 21st Century Guitar Conference, Ottawa, Ontario, Canada (performance J. Oliver On Freedom)
2018 Festival of New American Music, Sacramento (performance, music by Asia and Liderman)
2018 Guitar Foundation of America, Louisville (performance, adjudication, clinicians)
2009-2014 Soundscape New Music Festival, Italy (performance, clinicians)
2006-2008 Cortona Contemporary Music Festival, Italy (performance, clinicians)
2011 Guitar Foundation of America, Georgia (performance, adjudication, clinicians)
 2011 Guitar Seminar, Mannes College, NYC (Duo46 performance, panel “Composing  for Guitar, concert at the Latin American Center)
2009 Guitar Foundation of America, Los Angeles (clinicians)
2008 Guitar Foundation of America, San Francisco Conservatory (performance)
2006 Guitar Foundation of America, Oberlin Conservatory
2006 Entrecuerdas Guitar Festival, Chile (performance, masterclasses, clinicians)
2006 Arizona Western Arts Alliance, Los Angeles (Chamber Music America Ensemble Showcase)
2005 CSU Fresno New Music Festival (performance, clinicians)
2003 Hermopoulis International Guitar Festival, Greece
2004 University of Minnesota Deluth New Music Festival (performance, masterclasses, clinicians)
2002 Styria Chamber Music Festival, Austria (performance)
1999 Great Lakes Chamber Music Festival, Michigan (performance)
1998 Music '98, Cincinnati Conservatory of Music, Ohio (performance)

Radio 
British Broadcasting Corporation
Canadian Broadcasting Corporation
European Broadcasting Union
National Public Radio
Radio New Zealand
Bayrak Radio and Television (Turkey)

References

External links
 Duo46 Official Website
 Duo46 Interview at Tokafi
 Duo46 interview at Composition Today
 Faculty soundSCAPE- sound composition and performance exchange

American classical music groups
Musical groups established in 1994
1994 establishments in Arizona
Summit Records artists